Copies, Clones & Replicants is the seventh studio album by American rock band Powerman 5000. It is their first (and only) cover album, continuing the return to their more traditional industrial metal sound following 2009's Somewhere on the Other Side of Nowhere, but still keeping some of the pop-rock feel of their 2006 album Destroy What You Enjoy. Each song is a cover of some of the band's favorite tracks, which usually fall into the new wave genre.

Track listing

Personnel
Powerman 5000
Spider One – vocals, production
Velkro – guitar, production, engineer
Evan 9 – guitar, production
X51 – bass, production
GFlash – drums, production

Additional
 Anthony Focx – mastering
 Bruno O'Hara – photography

References

2011 albums
Powerman 5000 albums
Cleopatra Records albums